"Sha-La-La-La-La" is a song by Danish glam rock band Walkers. The song was co-written by band members Torben Lendager and Poul Dehnhardt. It entered the Danish charts at number eight in the last week of March 1973, and peaked at number two after three weeks, after which it disappeared from the charts. The song achieved worldwide exposure after being covered by Dutch Eurodance group Vengaboys.

Release history
It was initially released in Denmark on 30 March 1973 and later in Germany in May. It was later included on their Greatest Hits (1976) album.

Charts

Vengaboys version

Dutch Eurodance group Vengaboys covered the song as "Shalala Lala" and released it on 21 February 2000, as the second single from their third album, The Platinum Album (2000). It remixes the song with typical Vengaboys synth and drum beats, although it keeps substantially the same tempo. The cover became another hit for the band, topping the charts in New Zealand and Romania and peaking within the top five in at least 10 other countries, including Australia, Germany, Ireland, Sweden, and the United Kingdom.

Music video
The accompanying music video for "Shalala Lala" is modeled after the single cover. It takes place in a fictional Alpine bar named "Wurst & Women". The video primarily focuses on lead vocalist Kim Sasabone performing the song, while women dressed in a skimped-up version of a dirndl dance around. Some men are dressed in lederhosen. The two male group members compete with each other for the affections of Kim Sasabone. After the second verse, the song pauses with a record scratch wherein the two engage in a parody dance battle. The video ends when the bar is raided by the police.

Track listings
All tracks were written by Torben Lendager and Poul Dehnhardt except "48 Hours", written by Danski & DJ Delmundo.

 European CD1
 "Shalala Lala" (Hitradio mix) – 3:33
 "48 Hours" – 4:31

 European CD2 and Australian CD single
 "Shalala Lala" (Hitradio mix) – 3:33
 "Shalala Lala" (XXL mix) – 5:40
 "Shalala Lala" (karaoke version) – 3:30
 "Shalala Lala" (Alice Deejay remix) – 5:50
 "48 Hours" – 4:31
 "Shalala Lala" (banned by the BBC videoclip) – 3:33

 UK CD single
 "Shalala Lala" (Hitradio mix) – 3:34
 "Shalala Lala" (Alice Deejay remix) – 5:53
 "48 Hours" – 4:34
 "Shalala Lala" (video)

 UK cassette single
 "Shalala Lala" (Hitradio mix) – 3:34
 "Shalala Lala" (Alice Deejay remix) – 5:53
 "48 Hours" – 4:34

 Digital download
 "Shalala Lala" (Hitradio mix) – 3:33
 "Shalala Lala" (XXL mix) – 5:40
 "Shalala Lala" (karaoke version) – 3:30
 "Shalala Lala" (Alice Deejay remix) – 5:50

Charts

Weekly charts

Year-end charts

Certifications

Release history

Notable cover versions
 In 1974, the Cantopop band the Wynners was believed to be the earliest to release a cover version of the song. 
 British pop group Dreamhouse released their version of the song, which became a hit in Southeast Asia in 1997.
 Thai singer Prissana "Pookie" Praisaeng also released her version of the song, which over a million copies cassette sold in 1997. 
 Belgian accordionist and singer Matthias Lens recorded a Dutch version of the song for his self-titled album, Matthias Lens, the song peaking at number 46 in Belgium on the Ultratip chart in January 2014.
 Polish duo Mejk recorded a version of the song, which became a summer hit in Poland in 2019.

See also
 List of number-one singles from the 2000s (New Zealand)
 List of Romanian Top 100 number ones of the 2000s

References

External links
 

1973 singles
1973 songs
2000 singles
Dreamhouse (band) songs
English-language Dutch songs
Number-one singles in New Zealand
Number-one singles in Romania
Philips Records singles
Positiva Records singles
Songs written by Torben Lendager
Songs written for films
Vengaboys songs